Cholmondeley is a civil parish in Cheshire East, England. It contains 24 buildings that are recorded in the National Heritage List for England as designated listed buildings.  Of these, one is listed at Grade I, the highest grade, two are listed at Grade II*, the middle grade, and the others are at Grade II.  The parish is dominated by Cholmondeley Castle, its gardens and its estate.  In addition to the castle itself, almost all the listed buildings are related to it, or are nearby farm buildings.

Key

Buildings

See also
Listed buildings in Ridley
Listed buildings in Faddiley
Listed buildings in Chorley
Listed buildings in Wrenbury cum Frith
Listed buildings in Norbury
Listed buildings in Egerton
Listed buildings in Bulkeley

References
Citations

Sources

 

 

Listed buildings in the Borough of Cheshire East
Lists of listed buildings in Cheshire